Considered by many to be the mother of modern-day Baithak Gana, Dropati was introduced to the Indian music industry in the Caribbean by way of her album Let's Sing and Dance.  Produced in 1968, the album includes captivating wedding folk songs that easily transport the listener to colorful Indian village weddings dating centuries before Dropati's time.

Dropati's drummer was Sahadat Chedi, who was also the drummer for Ramdew Chaitoe, and many renowned Suriname Baithak Gana artists.

Notes and references

Surinamese musicians
Surinamese Hindus